Handa and Bhonda is a 2010 Indian Bengali-language film directed by Subhankar Chattopadhyay, starring Mithun Chakraborty, Aritra Dutta Banik, Biswajit Chakraborty and  Supriya Devi.

Plot

Handa (Mithun) is a simple, sincere and hardworking person, but his honesty even lands him in trouble sometimes, created by his not-so-perfect colleagues and his own boss (Biswajit). Handa's son, Bhonda (Aritra), is exactly opposite to his father's character isn't. He is a brat. He steals his father's money, flunks his unit tests, gets punished every day in school, also copies his father's signature in the progress report card, bunks classes and even hits on his most beautiful classmate, Medha. Both hate their life as it is troubled and they are looking for a miracle to happen. Handa wishes if he could become a kid again to help teach Bhonda what education could do to an individual. Bhonda, wishes to grow up to teach his father a lesson. Both their wishes come true as Bhonda's deceased mother's spirit grants them their wish for seven days. The father has his son's naughty soul and the son now has his father's honest soul. After some hilarious misadventures, Bhonda's soul in Handa's body teaches his colleagues and the boss a good lesson while Handa's soul in Bhonda's body turns over a new leaf as one of the best students in class. In the climax, the father-son duo rescues an orphanage from an evil contractor. The spell is lifted when the seven days are over. Handa is no longer the meek person,who can be taken on a ride. Bhonda gets back to his naughtiness,but in the spirit of good fun.

Cast 
Mithun Chakraborty as Mridul Roy aka Handa
Aritra Dutta Banik as Sayan Roy aka Bhonda, Handa's son
Biswajit Chakraborty
Sneha Chakraborty
Supriya Devi as manager of old orphanage home
Paran Bandopadhyay as neighbour of Handa-Bhonda
YourPritam as Satan's friend 
Rupa Chakraborty

Critical Reception
The film received mixed reviews. In The Indian Express, Shoma A. Chatterjee wrote "Lack of originality is the main lapse of this film. Chatterjee borrows generously from Mrinal Sen’s Icchapuran (1969) based on a Tagore story. He also dips into the Hollywood flick Freaky Friday (2003 film)".

Songs

References

External links
Times of India review

2010s Bengali-language films
2010 films
Bengali-language Indian films